Gran Premio Polla de Potrillos or Polla de Potrillos may refer to any one of several horse races:

 Gran Premio Polla de Potrillos (Argentina)
 Gran Premio Polla de Potrillos (Uruguay)